The Income-tax Act, 1961 is the charging statute of Income Tax in India. It provides for levy, administration, collection and recovery of Income Tax. The Government of India brought a draft statute called the "Direct Taxes Code" intended to replace the Income Tax Act, 1961 and the Wealth Tax Act, 1957. However the bill was later scrapped.

Amendments 

The Government of India presents finance bill (budget) every year in the month of February. The finance budget brings various amendments in Income-tax Act, 1961 including tax slabs rates. The amendments are generally applicable to the next following financial year beginning from 1 April unless otherwise specified. Such amendments become part of the income tax act after the approval of the president of India.

The partial budget which is presented for Non Full financial year (generally in the year of General Election in India) is called VOTE ON ACCOUNT. This is presented for the sake of continuation of those compulsory expenditures of Government which are necessary for the smooth functioning of Country and a full fledged budget is presented after a new government is formed.

Scope of total income 
The scope of Total Income depends on the category of a taxpayer and his residential status in India. For example, a person resident in India is liable to pay income tax in India on his total world income. On the other hand, a person non-resident in India is liable to pay tax in India only on his Indian income.
Under Income-tax Act, there are five heads of income - Salary, House Property, Business or Profession, Capital Gains and Other Sources. Total income consists of income computed under these heads.  The tax on total income is computed as per the tax rates specified for the year in which income is earned..

Simplification
Union Government sets up Arbind Modi-led panel to overhaul, simplify income tax laws. On 22 November 2017, the government formed a task force to draft a new direct tax law to replace the existing Income Tax Act, which has been in force since 1961. Arbind Modi, Member, Central Board of Direct Taxes (CBDT), will lead a six-member panel. Chief Economic Advisor Arvind Subramanian will be apermanent special invitee on the panel.

Notable cases 

 Cairn Energy and Government of India dispute
 Vodafone International Holdings B.V. vs. Union of India & Anr.

Notes

External links
 

Acts of the Parliament of India 1961
1961 in law
Income tax in India
Indian tax legislation
1961 in India
Indian legislation
History of taxation in India